The 2001 Mountain West Conference football season was the third since eight former members of the Western Athletic Conference banded together to form the Mountain West Conference. BYU won the conference championship in 2001, the Cougars' second title since the league began in 1999.

Coaching changes
Tom Craft took over at San Diego State, replacing Ted Tollner.
Gary Crowton took over at BYU, replacing BYU legend LaVell Edwards.

Bowl games

Awards
Coach of the Year: Gary Crowton, BYU
Offensive Player of the Year: RB Luke Staley, Jr, BYU
Defensive Player of the Year: DB Kevin Thomas, Sr, UNLV
Freshman of the Year: RB Dominique Dorsey, RB, UNLV

All Conference Team